Things Will Change is the companion remix disc to Enemies & Immigrants by American rock band Modwheelmood released in 2007. The proceeds from the sale of this album are given to the Los Angeles-based charity Create Now, a charity that deals with assisting and helping the lives of high-risk and at-risk youth through creative arts, mentoring, resources and opportunities. This album was conceived by and produced with the help of The 857 Collective's Celeste Tabora and has only been released digitally.

Track listing 

Yesterday (TRS-80 Dark Circles Mix) - 3:53
Going Nowhere (Home Video Remix) - 6:32
Delay Lama (Mellowdrone Remix) - 3:46
Things Will Change (Remodeled by Alva Noto) - 8:15
Things Will Change (Brightest Feather Remix) - 3:58 
As I Stand Here (Thavius Beck Remix) - 3:10	
Money fo Good (Ulysses Dub) - 5:50
Delay Lama (Nalepa Remix) - 6:01
Things Will Change (Kangding Ray Remix)	 - 4:08
Going Nowhere (Aaron Spectre Remix) - 5:18
Delay Lama (Paul & Price Remix) - 4:15
As I Stand Here (Cyrus Rex & Anon Remix) - 4:43
Going Nowhere (Christopher Willits Remix) - 3:10
Yesterday (Roger O'Donnell Remix) - 7:24

External links
Create Now official website

Modwheelmood albums
2007 remix albums